Chavdar Atanasov (born 3 February 1973, in Vratsa) is a Bulgarian retired football attacking midfielder. On 4 November 1999, he netted a goal for Levski Sofia in the 1:1 away draw with Juventus in the second leg of second round UEFA Cup match, with the "bluemen" being eliminated after a 2:4 aggregate score.

Honours
Levski Sofia
 Bulgarian League: 1999–00, 2000–01
 Bulgarian Cup: 2000

References

External links 
 Profile at Levskisofia.info 

1973 births
Living people
Bulgarian footballers
FC Botev Vratsa players
PFC CSKA Sofia players
PFC Beroe Stara Zagora players
PFC Litex Lovech players
PFC Levski Sofia players
PFC Lokomotiv Plovdiv players
PFC Belasitsa Petrich players
First Professional Football League (Bulgaria) players
Association football midfielders
People from Vratsa